Sofia Elizabeth Mantega, also known as Wind Dancer and formerly known as Renascence, is a fictional character, a mutant appearing in comic books published by Marvel Comics. One of the student body in the Xavier Institute, she is a member of the New Mutants squad therein. Her first appearance was in New Mutants, vol. 2 #1. At the beginning of New Mutants vol. 2, she is 16 years old.

Fictional character biography

Early life
Sofia was born and lived most of her life in Caracas, Venezuela. While under the care of her uncle, Sofia's mother is killed in a riot. Her only Venezuelan adult relative, an uncle, is unable to support her in addition to his own children, so she is sent to her father, who had been previously unaware of her existence. The head of a major supermarket chain located in the United States, Walter Barrett is a cold, asocial man with no interest in a daughter. As such, he extracts from her a promise that she would learn English before school started, she would get good grades, and she would not use her mutant power, in exchange for which all her material wants would be provided for without question.

Over the next three weeks, she befriends her father's manservant Derek, learns English, and joins a local school, but despite her outgoing nature, she has difficulty fitting in and is unable to reconcile herself to her father's lack of affection for her. She ultimately acts out by skipping school and wrecking one of her father's stores with hurricane-force winds, making sure her actions are caught on a store security camera. Her father is incensed, less at the destruction of his store than by her exposing him as the father of a mutant, and considers leaving her in prison for 48 hours to punish her. Danielle Moonstar, having seen Sofía's vandalism on the news, steps in and offers her a place at the Xavier Institute.

Xavier Institute
Resident mischief maker Julian Keller (codenamed Hellion) finds himself instantly attracted to Mantega and begins courting her. She rejects him after he makes derogatory remarks about her roommate, the shy Laurie Collins (later known as Wallflower), but the attraction remains mutual, and despite herself Sofia later ends up flirting with Julian during a combat training exercise. Derek remains in touch, even quitting his job when her father objects to his seeing Sofia.

Sofia and Laurie are assigned to the New Mutants squad, along with a runaway from Japan named Surge, Laurie's love interest and former Reaver Elixir, strait-laced David Alleyne (Prodigy), and dangerous but well-intentioned Wither. Sofia is generally well-liked and is voted as "Most Outgoing" in the school's yearbook.

Prodigy rejects the offer to lead the New Mutants, so the position falls to Sofia. She becomes isolated and irritable when the group loses their first training exercise, which she blames on her failure to lead. Her command decisions weaken further when Wither is arrested for the accidental death of his father, and she briefly sides with the Hellions, Julian's squad, to break him free. After the New Mutants fight the Hellions over the incident, Prodigy talks her into letting Wither go, and she tries to convince him to lead the New Mutants. He insists that Sofía's emotionalism has its advantage in a leadership role, but agrees to be co-leader, to better mesh their strengths.

Thereafter, Sofia's temper eases again until the school dance, where she catches Laurie manipulating Prodigy to make her ex-boyfriend Elixir jealous. Alarmed by the rapid disintegration of the squad, she finds herself kissing Julian, and he pushes her to end the in-fighting since she is the one who sees the good in everyone - even him. She tries to do so by forcing everyone to get together for a camp-out on the X-Mansion grounds. While bickering and even fist-fighting break out, Sofia is able to eventually reconcile her teammates.

Sofia loses her powers along with 98% of the mutant population when the Scarlet Witch produces a reality-bending spell in an attempt to solve the human/mutant problem. Along with most of the de-powered students, she moves out of the mansion, planning to return to Venezuela with Derek. She leaves the school abruptly without giving Julian notice after she catches him callously denouncing Prodigy after the latter lost his powers.

New Warriors
For as-yet-unknown reasons, Sofia moves to New York City, where she lives alone and works as a waitress. She feels directionless in her new "normal" life and has nightmares about losing her powers. During the dream, Sofia enjoyed the pleasures of winged flight.  Around this time, Sofia begins to receive strange messages from a group calling itself the New Warriors. The group sends a messenger whom Sofia recognizes as Barry, a young man she knew (and flirted with) from the restaurant she works in. Barry explains that he is a depowered mutant, and is actually her old friend from the Xavier Institute, Beak, whom she did not recognize because of his altered appearance post-M-Day. Beak transports Sofia into the secret base of the New Warriors, but she rejects their efforts to talk her into joining the group.

However, a battle between the New Warriors and a new Zodiac breaks out near the restaurant where Sofia works and she witnesses Cancer kill the New Warrior Longstrike. With the Warriors fighting a losing battle and a little boy caught in the crossfire, Sofia charges towards Cancer, providing enough distraction to give her friends the upper hand. While the superpowered individuals battle, Sofia tries to get the young boy to safety but is blasted from behind. At the hospital, doctors determine Sofia is suffering from burns, a concussion, and various other problems from the attack. During a comatose state, Sofia dreams she is meeting her mother in Heaven and once again bears angel-like wings.

Sofia makes headlines for her heroic deeds during the battle. She is expected to fully recover and has only lost her hair due to surgery. Upon her release from the hospital, Mantega reconsiders Night Thrasher's offer to join the team right as he is about to disband the group following the disastrous encounter with the Zodiac.

Renascence
Sofia's first mission as a New Warrior puts her and the team up against the Alphaclan, a villain team atop of S.H.I.E.L.D.'s most wanted list. While Wondra says Sofia "held her own on her first mission", the team's efforts fall short until Night Thrasher intervenes.

Sofia takes on the codename Renascence while operating with the New Warriors. She continues to waitress at her job and lives off-base as to never be dependent on someone else ever again. After the New Warriors disband Sofia keeps the tech she had been given.

Krakoa
A long time later, Sofia somehow heard of the Mojoverse's new-found obsession with mutants and started live streaming and climbing the broadcasting charts. After making a poll with her followers, it was revealed the majority wanted to see her die, so she hired Adam X to execute her. Moments before her demise, she addressed the audience one last time: "Let's give the people what they want".

Upon seeing the proof of death, The Five proceeded with her resurrection, returning her powers in the process. After being reunited with Hellion and her other friends, she revealed to them that she had to let herself get killed in order to escape, but Spiral, Adam X and Shatterstar still needed rescuing.

Powers and abilities
As the mutant Wind Dancer, Sofia has the ability to control the movement of air, which included the ability to generate wind with intense force, lift and carry objects, fly and, more subtly, amplify small vibrations in the air - allowing her to hear faraway conversations.

She also uses her powers to create a "cutting" effect by refining the force of the wind. When at close range, she can also compress air into a person's ear to disrupt their middle ear's equilibrium thereby disturbing their balance.

As Renascence, she wore a suit equipped with six metal cybernetic tentacles that could discharge surges of electricity from its claws. She was also equipped with a personal force field that emits a golden aura.

Sofia has some athletic and martial arts skills due to her training as a New Mutant at Xavier's and the combat sessions with the New Warriors.

Other versions

House of M
Wind Dancer is a S.H.I.E.L.D. trainee in the House of M reality.  During the House of M crossover (which later led to Decimation), Wind Dancer was shown as a S.H.I.E.L.D trainee, in the Hellions Squad, under Dani Moonstar's supervision, and involved in a rather intimate relationship with Scion (Julian's counterpart).

In this reality, she battled control against Wallflower's pheromones that manipulated the New Mutant Leadership Institute's students into fighting with the S.H.I.E.L.D. trainees to the death.

After Wallflower was killed and her influence severed, the surviving young mutants teamed up to attack Emperor Sunfire, who headed Project: Genesis, a plan to mutate baseline humans. Sunfire ordered their death, but reality was reverted before anything further happened.

References

Comics characters introduced in 2003
Marvel Comics mutants
Fictional characters with air or wind abilities
Fictional Venezuelan people
Latin American superheroes
Marvel Comics female superheroes
Marvel Comics martial artists
New Mutants
Characters created by Nunzio DeFilippis
Characters created by Christina Weir